Boris Blank (born 15 January 1952) is a Swiss artist and musician. He is known for his work in the musical duo Yello with Dieter Meier.

Career
Blank was born on 15 January 1952 in Bern, Switzerland. He is the musical part of Yello. He composes the songs and is responsible for the characteristic sound, having the reputation of a perfectionist. Blank considers himself as a constructor of music, starting composing with manipulation of self-recorded samples and finishing the tracks with the participation of invited professional musicians.

Prior to his musical career, Blank worked as a truck driver. As a child he was very interested in music, but had no formal training. He never learned to read musical notation but always was interested in producing new sounds and samples. Blank began experimenting with tape loops and echo effects as a teenager. He recorded water sounds from a bucket of water and played sounds on a homemade bamboo flute. It was in this period he met Carlos Perón. Later, they formed Yello, with Dieter Meier as a conceptualist, vocalist and lyricist.

He also composes and produces solo music, under the name Avant Garden, which is strictly intended for licensing to the film and TV production industry. This music is handled by Extreme Music.

Personal life

Blank is married to Italian-Swiss restaurateur Patrizia Fontana. They have one daughter, Olivia.

Discography

Albums

References

External links
Official site

Boris Blank interview in Sound On Sound magazine copy in the Internet Archive 

1952 births
Living people
20th-century Swiss musicians
21st-century Swiss musicians
Musicians from Zürich
Swiss artists
Swiss pop musicians
Synth-pop musicians